Al Gentry may refer to:

 Alwyn Gentry (1945–1993), American botanist and plant collector
 Al Gentry (politician) (born 1964), American politician and member of the Kentucky House of Representatives